Royal Naval Engineers as a branch of the Royal Navy, have existed since 1835.

Naval engineers are in charge of the management and upkeep of ship-board machinery. Traditionally this included engines, motors, pumps and other mechanical devices, but modern engineers are now responsible for both mechanical systems and high-tech electronics such radar and sonar systems and nuclear-power plants.

Ranking 
When the corps was first created, there were three ranks for engineers: First, second, and third. Over the years this ranking system has changed several times:
 1835 - First, second and third engineer.
 1847 - Inspector of machinery, chief engineer; assistant engineer.
 1886 - Chief inspector and inspector of machinery (r.adm and captain), fleet engineer (cdr), and staff engineer (senior lieutenant).
 1903 - Standard executive rank titles with an "engineer" prefix.
 1956 - "Engineer" prefix and rank branch distinction cloth removed finally making engineers indistinguishable from seaman officers.

Fields of expertise 
After graduating from university and receiving a basic training, naval engineer officers specialize in a particular field.

 Marine engineer officer (MEO) - deals with the fuel, air, water, electrical, and propulsion systems including nuclear reactors for those appointed to submarines.
 Air engineer officer (AEO) - maintenance and upgrading of engines and electrical systems in aircraft.
 Weapon engineer officer (WEO) - ensures that weapon systems are working properly.

Students 
In 1888 engineer studentships were created.  Today, there are several different student-scholarship programs available including the University Cadetship Entry, a competitive program in which students enlist and train at Britannia Royal Naval College before going to university.

References
 Engineer Officer, Royal Navy.
 https://web.archive.org/web/20160304075442/http://www.royalnavy.mod.uk/static/pages/4746.html

Royal Navy